Kirdasovo (Qırźas) is a rural locality (a village) and the administrative center of Kirdasovsky Selsoviet, Abzelilovsky District, Bashkortostan, Russia. The population was 656 as of 2010. There are 9 streets.

Geography 
Kirdasovo is located 25 km southwest of Askarovo (the district's administrative centre) by road. Baymurzino is the nearest rural locality.

References 

Rural localities in Abzelilovsky District